Samuel Newhouse (October 18, 1853 – September 22, 1930) was a Utah entrepreneur and mining magnate.

Life and career
Newhouse was born in New York City, of European Jewish immigrant parents but studied and practiced law in Pennsylvania. He moved to Colorado in 1879. In Leadville, he became involved in the freighting business.

In 1883, he married Ida Stingly, whose mother ran a local boarding house. She was 16 at the time. While they ran a hotel in Leadville, Samuel acquired mining properties in Ouray, Colorado. He later sold these for several million dollars and moved to Denver, where he became a speculator and promoter, with extensive contacts back East and in Europe.

In 1896, he moved to Utah, where partnering with Thomas Weir, he became instrumental in securing English investment in the fledgling copper mining operation in Bingham canyon, which later became the great Bingham Canyon Mine. He also developed silver mining in the San Francisco Mountains near Beaver, Utah, investing approximately $2 million to build a mine, mill and develop the town of Newhouse, named after himself.  He was instrumental in driving the Newhouse Tunnel (now called the Argo Tunnel), a major mine drainage tunnel in Idaho Springs, Colorado.

He maintained residences on Long Island, New York and in London and a chateau in France.  He preferred living in Salt Lake City, where he developed a large tract of downtown, trying to shift the center of town four blocks south from Temple Square. He built the city's first skyscrapers (11 stories), the Boston and Newhouse buildings.

At one time he owned the lot where the future Flatiron Building in New York City would be located.  However, "his financial empire crashed in 1916".

External links 
 Utah History Encyclopedia: Samuel Newhouse

References 

1853 births
1930 deaths
American Jews
American real estate businesspeople
Businesspeople from Salt Lake City
Jews and Judaism in Utah
American mining businesspeople
People from Beaver County, Utah